Theloderma laeve is a species of frog in the family Rhacophoridae. As currently known, it is endemic to central and southern Vietnam, although its true range could well extend into adjacent eastern Cambodia and perhaps Laos. Individuals have been spotted in bamboo bushes and rattan palms. Reproduction takes place in streams.

References

laeve
Amphibians of Vietnam
Endemic fauna of Vietnam
Amphibians described in 1924
Taxa named by Malcolm Arthur Smith
Taxonomy articles created by Polbot